The surname Topor may refer to:

 Juraj Topor, a musician in Slovak rock band Tublatanka
 Krzysztof Topór (born 1972), Polish Olympic biathlete
 Marcela Topor (born 1976), Romanian journalist and First Lady of Catalonia
 Nikolai Topor-Stanley (born 1985), Australian football (soccer) player 
 Roland Topor (1938–1997), French surrealist artist, writer, and filmmaker
 Ted Topor (1930–2017), American football player
 Tom Topor (born 1938), American playwright, screenwriter, and novelist

See also
 
 Topor (disambiguation)
 Toporov (surname)

Slavic-language surnames